Preeti Dharmanand Dimri (born 18 October 1986) is an Indian former cricketer who played as a slow left-arm unorthodox bowler. She appeared in two Test matches, 23 One Day Internationals and one Twenty20 International for India between 2006 and 2010. She played domestic cricket for Uttar Pradesh, Railways and Railways.

She made her debut in international cricket during India's tour of the British Isles on 29 July 2006 in a WODI against Ireland at Park Avenue, Dublin. She earned her first cap in all three formats of international cricket in the space of ten days.

References

External links
 
 

1986 births
Living people
Cricketers from Uttar Pradesh
India women Test cricketers
India women One Day International cricketers
India women Twenty20 International cricketers
Uttar Pradesh women cricketers
Railways women cricketers
Rajasthan women cricketers
Central Zone women cricketers